Time binding can refer to
 human progress as seen from the perspective of general semantics, an educational discipline created by Alfred Korzybski in the 1930s
 time bind, a sociological concept relevant to family and labor, introduced by Arlie Russell Hochschild in the 1990s

General semantics